= Premio dei premi =

Italian civil award

The Premio dei Premi (National Award for Innovation) is an Italian accolade established to recognize and promote excellence in innovation across various sectors, including industry, academia, public administration, and the service sector. Instituted by the president of the Italian Republic, the award aims to foster a culture of innovation within the country.

== History and purpose ==
Established in 2008, the Premio dei Premi is managed by the Fondazione COTEC, an organization dedicated to advancing technological innovation in Italy. The award seeks to highlight outstanding achievements in innovation, encouraging the development and dissemination of innovative practices and solutions.

=== Impact ===
The Premio dei Premi plays a significant role in promoting a culture of innovation in Italy. By recognizing and celebrating innovative achievements, the award encourages organizations and individuals to pursue creative solutions, thereby contributing to the nation's progress and competitiveness on a global scale.
